The 2010 Jordan Brand Classic, Presented by Foot Locker was an All-star basketball game played on Saturday, April 17, 2010 at Madison Square Garden in New York, New York, home of the NBA's New York Knicks.  The game's rosters featured the best and most highly recruited high school boys graduating in 2010.  The game was the 9th annual version of the Jordan Brand Classic first played in 2002.

The game takes its name from the chief organizer, Jordan Brand, a division of NIKE, Inc.  The 20 players are routinely selected from the top 100 players as ranked by ESPNU.  “As our preeminent basketball game, the Jordan Brand Classic strives to put the top talent on the floor each year and this year is no exception,” said Keith Houlemard, President of Jordan Brand.  “We are thrilled to host the nation’s best at the World’s Most Famous Arena in the biggest city in the U.S.”

The 2010 selections consisted of the top 13 ranked players, 15 from the top 16, 18 from the top 25, and all 20 from the top 50 players in the rankings.

2010 Game
The 2010 game was played at Madison Square Garden in New York, New York on April 17, 2010.

2010 East Roster

2010 West Roster

Coaches
The East team was coached by:
 Head Coach Greg Wise of Yates High School (Houston, Texas)
 Asst Coach Charles Smith of Peabody Magnet High School (Alexandria, Louisiana)
 Asst Coach Doug Lipscomb of Wheeler High School (Marietta, Georgia)

The West team was coached by:
 Head Coach Mike Peck of Findlay Prep (Henderson, Nevada)
 Asst Coach Pat Strickland of Jefferson High School (Portland, Oregon)
 Asst Coach Mark Mugiishi of 'Iolani High School (Honolulu, Hawaii)

Boxscore

Visitors: East

Home: West 

* = Starting Line-up

All-American Week

Schedule 
The Jordan Brand Classic is the third game of a triple-header.  In addition to the featured game, the schedule includes a Regional Game that showcases the top prep players from the New York City metropolitan area in a City vs. Suburbs showdown.  Now in its third year, an International Game is also played that features 16 of the top 17-and-under players from around the world.

This year’s triple-header will begin with the Regional Game at 3:30 p.m. followed by the International Game at 5:30 p.m., and the All-American Game at 8:00 p.m.

In addition to the game, the Jordan Brand All-Americans have a number of special events around New York City.  Other events held in prior years have included an autograph session at the Foot Locker House of Hoops, a celebrity bowling event at Lucky Strikes, a visit with kids from the Children’s Aid Society at the Dunlevy Millbank Center in Harlem and attendance at the annual awards dinner, where they receive their All-American medallions.

References

External links
Jordan Brand Classic on the web

Jordan Brand Classic All-American Game
Jordan Brand Classic All-American Game
Jordan Brand Classic
2010s in Manhattan
Basketball in New York City
Madison Square Garden
Sports competitions in New York City
Sports in Manhattan